Athletics was contested at the 1962 Asian Games at the Senayan Main Stadium, Jakarta, Indonesia from 25 to 30 August.

Medalists

Men

Women

Medal table

References
Asian Games Results. GBR Athletics. Retrieved on 2014-10-04.
Women's relay medallists. Incheon2014. Retrieved on 2014-10-04.
Men's relay medallists. Incheon2014. Retrieved on 2014-10-04.

 
1962 Asian Games events
1962
Asian Games
1962 Asian Games